Killian's Pass, is situated in the Eastern Cape, province of South Africa, on the road between Dordrecht, Eastern Cape and Barkly East.

See also
 List of mountain passes of the Eastern Cape

References

Mountain passes of the Eastern Cape